Eupithecia truschi is a moth in the family Geometridae. It is found in central Iran (Markazi and Esfahan).

The wingspan is 15.5–19 mm. The forewings are bright ochreous orange with broad, dark blackish brown transverse lines. The hindwings are paler, whitish in the costal part and darker, bright ochreous orange in the anal and terminal parts.

Etymology
The species is named in honour of the geometrid specialist Robert Trusch.

References

Moths described in 2012
truschi
Moths of Asia